William Courtenay, 10th Earl of Devon (19 June 1777 – 19 March 1859) was a 19th-century British aristocrat and politician, who sat in the Commons before entering the House of Lords after succeeding to the title of Earl of Devon in 1835.

Life
He was born on 19 June 1777, the eldest son of Dr Henry Reginald Courtenay, Bishop of Exeter and his wife Lady Elizabeth Howard, daughter of Lieut-Gen Thomas Howard, 2nd Earl of Effingham.

Courtenay was educated at Westminster School before going up to Christ Church, Oxford. He was called to the bar at Lincoln's Inn in 1799, and served from 1817 until 1826 as a Master-in-Chancery.

Returned as Member of Parliament for Exeter from 1812 until January 1826, he resigned his seat upon appointment as Assistant Clerk to the House of Lords, at an annual salary of £4,000, and was pleased to assist his cousin, Viscount Courtenay, establish his right, in 1831, to the ancient family earldom before the Parliamentary Committee of Privileges. He stayed in post until May 1835, when he succeeded his second cousin as 10th Earl of Devon, as well as inheriting Powderham Castle in Devon and estates in Ireland. He was elected High Steward of Oxford University in 1838, and was also a governor of Charterhouse.

In 1843, British prime minister, Sir Robert Peel, asked him to chair a commission on Irish land tenure. The resulting report by the Devon Commission was published in 1845.

Sporting career
Courtenay is known to have played in one first-class cricket match in 1797, scoring a single run in his two innings.

Family
He was married twice,  firstly to Harriet Leslie Pepys, daughter of Sir Lucas Pepys and his first wife Jane Elizabeth Leslie, 12th Countess of Rothes, and secondly to Elizabeth Scott,   daughter of Rev. John Scott of County Wicklow. Lord Devon was succeeded in the family titles by his eldest son, who was appointed a Cabinet member and a Privy Counsellor. His second son, Hon. and Revd Prebendary Henry Courtenay succeeded his nephew as 12th earl, while his fourth and youngest surviving son, Hon. and Revd Canon Leslie Courtenay, served as Domestic Chaplain to Queen Victoria before becoming a Canon of Windsor.

Death
Lord Devon died at Shrivenham, then in Berkshire, while visiting his brother-in-law, Ven. Edward Berens, Archdeacon of Berkshire, on 19 March 1859.

See also
 House of Courtenay
 Courtenay baronets

References

Bibliography
 
 Burke's Peerage & Baronetage

1777 births
1859 deaths
William Courtenay, 10th Earl of Devon
People educated at Westminster School, London
Alumni of Christ Church, Oxford
English cricketers of 1787 to 1825
Tory MPs (pre-1834)
Members of the Parliament of the United Kingdom for Exeter
UK MPs 1812–1818
UK MPs 1818–1820
UK MPs 1820–1826
Devon, E10
Earls of Devon (1553 creation)
English cricketers
Colonel C. Lennox's XI cricketers